Now Playing may refer to:

 Now Playing (Dave Grusin album), released in 2004
 Now Playing (Juris album), released in 2010
 Now Playing (magazine), a short-lived entertainment magazine